Curls Run (Kirl, Kyrl, Carl, Curl) is a tributary of Pidcock Creek in Bucks County, Pennsylvania, part of the Delaware River drainage basin.

History
Curls Run was named for Thomas Kirl, an early landowner in Buckingham Township, Bucks County, Pennsylvania, in the United States, whose land was later purchased by Robert Smith in 1723. Other landowners along the creek were Harry Trego, Earl Daniels, John Hogan, Harvey R. Smith, William E. Smith, Charles R. Wentz, Charles W. Livezey, and Lettie A. Betts. It was first mentioned in 1789 in an agreement to set off land for a schoolhouse referred to as the 'Red Schoolhouse'. In the Atlas of Bucks County by E. P. Noll & Co. in 1891, it was referred to erroneously as 'Curtis Run'.

Statistics
Curls Run was entered into the Geographic Names Information System of the U.S. Geological Survey on 1 April 1990 as identification number 1202642.

Course
Curls Run rises in Upper Makefield Township, just east of Pineville, starting out northeast, then turns to the north flowing through an unnamed pond, passing into Buckingham Township, then flowing to the northeast until it meets its confluence at Pidcock Creek's 3.21 river mile in Solebury Township.

Municipalities
Solebury Township
Buckingham Township
Upper Makefield Township

Bridges and Crossings
Township Line Road
Street Road

References

Rivers of Bucks County, Pennsylvania
Rivers of Pennsylvania
Tributaries of the Delaware River